Beaucarnea goldmanii is a tree in the family Asparagaceae. It is native to Mexico and northern Central America.

Description
The base of the trunk is swollen. Its bark is furrowed.

Distribution and habitat
Beaucarnea goldmanii is native to Mexico, Guatemala, Honduras and El Salvador. In Mexico, the species is confined to Chiapas.

Conservation
Beaucarnea goldmanii has been assessed as vulnerable on the IUCN Red List. It is threatened by agriculture, including damage to young trees from cattle. It is also threatened by illegal harvesting for the ornamental plant trade. The species' range includes Sumidero Canyon in Chiapas, part of a national park where the species is afforded a level of protection.

References

goldmanii
Flora of Chiapas
Flora of Guatemala
Flora of Honduras
Flora of El Salvador
Plants described in 1909
Taxa named by Joseph Nelson Rose